Robert Shilyngford, or Shillenford (died c. 1553) was Mayor of Dublin in 1534–35. Apart from his tenure in this office, he is mainly remembered as the first of the six husbands of Jenet Sarsfield.

Jenet was only about seven when her future husband was elected Mayor of Dublin, so their marriage probably did not take place until the mid-1540s. The couple had one daughter, Katherine, who was Jenet's only surviving child. Katherine married Thomas Talbot of Dardistown Castle, County Meath, and had issue, including Jenet, who married Robert Barnewall, 7th Baron Trimlestown.

Robert died before 1554, when Jenet remarried, to James Luttrell. She had six husbands in all, including Robert Plunkett, 5th Baron of Dunsany and the eminent judges Sir Thomas Cusack and Sir John Plunket.

Although Shilyngford was the father of her only surviving child, Jenet does not seem to have attached much importance to his memory, preferring in later life to be known as Lady Dunsany, under which title she was buried at Moorchurch, near Julianstown, County Meath, in her own tomb, separately from any of her husbands.

References 

Year of birth unknown
16th-century Irish politicians
Lord Mayors of Dublin
1550s deaths
Year of death uncertain